Quantitative biology is an umbrella term encompassing the use of mathematical, statistical or computational techniques to study life and living organisms. The central theme and goal of quantitative biology is the creation of predictive models based on fundamental principles governing living systems.

The subfields of biology that employ quantitative approaches include:
 Mathematical and theoretical biology
 Computational biology
 Bioinformatics
 Biostatistics
 Systems biology
 Population biology
 Synthetic biology
 Epidemiology

References 

Branches of biology